Bishop Jacek Pyl, O.M.I. (born 17 August 1962 in Garwolin, Poland) is a Polish-born Ukrainian Roman Catholic prelate, who serves as an Auxiliary bishop of the Roman Catholic Diocese of Odessa-Simferopol and the Titular Bishop of Nova Sinna since 21 October 2006.

Life
Bishop Pyl was born in the Roman-Catholic family in a present day Masovian Voivodeship. After graduation of the school education, joined the Missionary Oblates of Mary Immaculate in 1977; he made a solemn profession on September 8, 1986, and was ordained as priest on June 20, 1988, after graduation of the Major Missionary Oblates Theological Seminary in Obra, Poland and Theological faculty of the Adam Mickiewicz University in Poznań, Poland.

After his ordination he served as an assistant novice master for the Missionary Oblates in Poland from 1988 until 1990, when he has been transferred to Ukraine. Fr. Pyl served in the Missionary Oblates parishes in the different regions of Ukraine. When in 1997 was established the Delegature of Missionary Oblates of Mary Immaculate in Ukraine, he became the first its Superior until 2006. Also he again served as a Superior of the Delegature a short time in 2012.

On November 23, 2012, he was appointed by the Pope Benedict XVI as the Auxiliary Bishop of the Roman Catholic Diocese of Odessa-Simferopol and Titular Bishop of Nova Sinna. On January 5, 2013, he was consecrated as bishop by Bishop Bronislaw Bernacki and other prelates of the Roman Catholic Church.

From 2013 he is residing in Simferopol.

References

1962 births
Living people
People from Garwolin County
Missionary Oblates of Mary Immaculate
Adam Mickiewicz University in Poznań alumni
Ukrainian people of Polish descent
Polish expatriates in Ukraine
21st-century Roman Catholic bishops in Ukraine